NA-253 Harnai-cum-Sibbi-cum-Kohlu-cum-Dera Bugti is a newly-created constituency for the National Assembly of Pakistan. It comprises the districts of Harnai, Sibi, Kohlu and Dera Bugti from the province of Balochistan.

Assembly Segments

Members of Parliament

2018-2022: NA-259 Dera Bugti-cum-Kohlu-cum-Barkhan-cum-Sibbi-cum-Lehri

Election 2018 

General elections were held on 25 July 2018.

See also
NA-252 Loralai-cum-Musakhel-cum-Duki-cum-Barkhan
NA-254 Nasirabad-cum-Kachhi-cum-Jhal Magsi

References 

National Assembly Constituencies of Pakistan